Maksym Danylo Kowal (born June 4, 1991) is a Canadian professional soccer player who plays as a forward for Greifswalder FC.

Early life
Kowal was born in Toronto, Ontario, growing up in nearby Mississauga, Ontario and is of Ukrainian descent. He began playing youth soccer with USC Karpaty, later moving to the Erin Mills Eagles at U14 level.

Club career

College and Semi-pro
Kowal attended the University at Buffalo beginning in 2009 and played for the soccer team. During his college tenure he played in the USL Premier Development League with Des Moines Menace and Toronto Lynx.

England
In 2013, he went abroad to England, first joining non-league club Barnstaple Town F.C. Afterwards, he joined Tiverton Town F.C. He then joined eighth tier Carlton Town F.C.

Poland
In 2015, he joined Polish second-tier club Widzew Łódź in the I liga, however, due to procedural reasons with having arrived from a non-professional club, he was unable to be registered to be eligible for league matches. Widzew was relegated at the end of the season and went bankrupt and was relegated to the fifth tier, and subsequently, in July 2015, Kowal joined tird-tier club Raków Częstochowa in the II liga. In February 2016. he joined Olimpia Zambrów on a six-month loan. The following season he joined ŁKS Łódź helping them win promotion that season.

New Zealand
In 2017, he joined ISPS Handa Premiership side Tasman United in the New Zealand first tier, being recommended by a friend who played in the league. In the offseason, he joined North Wellington AFC in New Zealand's second tier Central Premier League, where he helped lead the team to the league championship and won the Golden Boot as the league's top goalscorer with 23 goals, while also adding another three goals in the 2018 Chatham Cup. He was also named the league player of the year. In September 2018, he then returned to the top tier for the new season, joining Canterbury United.

Canada
In 2019, he returned to the North American continent to play in League1 Ontario with Vaughan Azzurri. He featured in the 2019 Canadian Championship against HFX Wanderers FC. In July, he scored a hat trick against Durham United FA in 21 minutes. In his debut season with Vaughan he finished as the league's top goalscorer, winning the Golden Boot, as well as being named league MVP. In late 2019, he played in the Canadian Soccer League with FC Ukraine United.

On August 10, 2020, Kowal signed with Canadian Premier League side Atlético Ottawa. He made his debut in Ottawa's inaugural match on August 15 against York9, coming on as a substitute and playing out a 2–2 draw.

Germany
On October 27, 2020, Kowal joined German club Germania Halberstadt in the fourth tier Regionalliga Nordost. A day later, he made his debut for the club scoring a goal against Chemie Leipzig. He celebrated the goal by taking off his jersey, which earned him a second yellow card, resulting in him being ejected from the match. He then had to return to Canada, due to travel issues, before returning to Germany, however, the season was suspended soon after for the remainer of 2020, due to the second wave of the COVID-19 pandemic.

In July 2022, Kowal joined newly promoted side Greifswalder FC in the same division.

Personal life
Born in Mississauga, Ontario in Canada,  Kowal's family has Ukrainian origin, although his parents were both born in Poland.  He holds dual citizenship with Poland and Canada. His father played professional basketball professional in Poland with AZS Szczecin and AZS Koszalin. He attended St. Paul Secondary School in Mississauga and played youth soccer for the Erin Mills Eagles SC, where he won the U18 provincial championship in 2009.

Career statistics

References

External links
 
 
 Maksym Kowal at FuPa

1991 births
Living people
Association football forwards
Canadian soccer players
Soccer players from Toronto
Canadian expatriate soccer players
Expatriate association footballers in New Zealand
Expatriate footballers in England
Expatriate footballers in Poland
Expatriate soccer players in the United States
Canadian expatriate sportspeople in England
Canadian expatriate sportspeople in the United States
Canadian expatriate sportspeople in Poland
Canadian expatriate sportspeople in New Zealand
Canadian people of Ukrainian descent
II liga players
New Zealand Football Championship players
League1 Ontario players
Canadian Soccer League (1998–present) players
Canadian Premier League players
Vaughan Azzurri players
Canadian people of Polish descent
III liga players
Regionalliga players
Barnstaple Town F.C. players
Carlton Town F.C. players
Des Moines Menace players
ŁKS Łódź players
Olimpia Zambrów players
Raków Częstochowa players
Tiverton Town F.C. players
Toronto Lynx players
Widzew Łódź players
Tasman United players
FC Ukraine United players
Atlético Ottawa players
VfB Germania Halberstadt players